Elbow-Sheep Wildland Provincial Park is a provincial park and wildlife reserve located in the Kananaskis Country in south-western Alberta, Canada. It is within the Canadian Rocky Mountains.

Activities
The park offers setting for hiking, mountain biking and horseback riding through mountain landscapes of lodgepole pine and spruce forests.

Photo gallery

See also
 List of provincial parks in Alberta
 List of Canadian provincial parks

External links

Park page at Alberta Community Development Site
Park page at Alberta Parks

Provincial parks of Alberta
Kananaskis Improvement District